Cochylimorpha gracilens is a species of moth of the family Tortricidae.

It is found in Tibet.

References

 

G
Moths of Asia
Fauna of Tibet
Moths described in 1992